"Do My..." is a song by American rapper Memphis Bleek, released as the third and final single from his debut album The Understanding (2000). The song features vocals from fellow rapper Jay-Z, with production handled by A Kid Called Roots. It peaked at number 68 on the US Hot R&B/Hip-Hop Songs chart.

Charts

Release history

References

2000 songs
Jay-Z songs
Memphis Bleek songs
Music videos directed by Dave Meyers (director)
Roc-A-Fella Records singles
Songs written by Jay-Z